Electronic services delivery or ESD refers to providing government services through the Internet or other electronic means. It is related to e-services and e-government.

Defining e-service
E-service (or eservice) is a highly generic term usually referring to ‘The provision of services via the Internet (the prefix 'e' standing for ‘electronic’, as it does in many other usages), thus e-Service may also include e-Commerce, although it may also include non-commercial services (online), which is usually provided by the government.’ (Alexei Pavlichev & G. David Garson, 2004: 169-170; Muhammad Rais & Nazariah, 2003: 59, 70-71).

‘An umbrella term for services available on the Internet, e-Service include e-Commerce transaction services for handling online orders, application hosting by application service providers (ASPs) and any processing capability that is obtainable on the Web.’ (Computer Desktop Encyclopedia, 2009)

E-Service or 'electronic service' constitutes the online services available on the Internet, whereby a valid transaction of buying and selling (procurement) is possible, as opposed to the traditional websites, whereby only descriptive information are available, and no online transaction is made possible.' (Jeong, 2007).

External links 
United Nations E-government project
GEOMunicipal - e-services for Local governments]]

References

Open government
Public administration